Charles Gérard (born Gérard Adjémian, 1 December 1922 – 19 September 2019) was a French actor and director. He appeared in more than fifty films beginning in 1957. In many films he worked with director Claude Lelouch. He was a close friend of Jean-Paul Belmondo for over 60 years. Gérard was of Armenian origin.

Filmography

Actor

Director
 The Law of Men (1962)

Television

References

External links 
 

1922 births
2019 deaths
French people of Armenian descent
Ethnic Armenian male actors
French male film actors
French male television actors
French film directors
French male screenwriters
French screenwriters
Male actors from Marseille